Helen Phillips (born 1981) is an American novelist. She is a  winner of the Story Prize.

Biography 
She was born in Colorado  When she was a child she was affected by alopecia, and by the age of 11 had lost all of her hair.

She graduated from Yale University in 2004, and received her Masters of Fine Arts (MFA) from Brooklyn College (CUNY) in 2007. She moved to Brooklyn with a position as associate professor at Brooklyn College with her husband, the artist Adam Douglas Thompson, and their children.

Her debut was the story collection And Yet They Were Happy.  It was named a notable collection by The Story Prize. In 2013 she wrote a children's adventure novel. She followed with her first adult novel The Beautiful Bureaucrat.

Awards and recognition 
Finalist in the 2009 Leapfrog Press Global Fiction Prize Contest 
Rona Jaffe Foundation Writer’s Award, 2009
Iowa Review Nonfiction Award 
DIAGRAM Innovative Fiction Award, (date needed)
Italo Calvino Prize in Fabulist Fiction

Selected works

Novels 

The Beautiful Bureaucrat (2015)  which was named a New York Times notable book in 2015.
The Need (2019)

Short story collections 

And Yet They Were Happy (2011) winner of The Story Prize, finalist in the Leapfrog Press Global Fiction Prize Contest (2009), published by Leapfrog Press
Some Possible Solutions (2016) received the 2017 John Gardner Fiction Book Award.

Children's books 
 Here Where the Sunbeams Are Green (2012) was published internationally as Upside Down in the Jungle.

References 

Living people
American women short story writers
American women novelists
21st-century American women writers
21st-century American short story writers
Novelists from Colorado
Yale University alumni
1981 births
Brooklyn College alumni
Brooklyn College faculty